Época is a Brazilian weekly news and analysis magazine. The magazine was started in May 1998. It is published by Editora Globo, part of the Grupo Globo media conglomerate. Época'''s style is based on the German magazine Focus, emphasizing the use of images and graphics, and even their logos share some similarities.

Circulation
In 2010, Época had a circulation of 408,000 copies. It dipped to 389,000 copies in 2012 and slightly rose to 393,000 in 2013. In 2018, it circulates over 500,000 copies weekly and has 5.9 million unique digital users.

Delivery
Beginning in 2018, subscribers receive Época, GLOBO, and Valor Econômico'' delivered together on Fridays.

References

External links

1998 establishments in Brazil
Magazines published in Brazil
Weekly magazines published in Brazil
Globo magazines
Mass media in Rio de Janeiro (city)
Magazines established in 1998
News magazines published in South America
Portuguese-language magazines